Wifred or Wilfred (or ) ( 970 – 1050) was the Count of Cerdanya (988–1035; as Wifred II) and Count of Berga (1003–1035; as Wifred I). He was the eldest son of Oliba Cabreta and Ermengard of Empúries.

Life
When his father abdicated in 988 to become a monk in Monte Cassino, Wifred's brother Bernard received Besalú while Oliba received Berga. Their mother acted as regent until 994. When Oliba followed his father into the church in 1003, his county passed to Wifred. In that year Wifred and Bernard joined an alliance of Christian princes to fend off a Muslim invasion at the Battle of Torà.

Like his father and brother before him, he had a great affection for the church. He participated actively in the consecration of many churches and monasteries, such as San Martín del Canigó, founded in 1007 and consecrated in 1009. Despite this, he did fight to free his county from the jurisdiction of the diocese of Urgell and thus entered into conflict with Saint Ermengol.

In 1023, Wifred entered into a peace concord with Berengar Raymond I of Barcelona and William I of Besalú. In the early thirteenth-century Liber feudorum Ceritaniae the first folio is illuminated with a scene of Wifred receiving the homage of Sarn and Dalmau, lords of Castellfollit. The picture, painted by a different artist from the rest of book, is of a higher calibre than the others and is in the Byzantinist style that was becoming dominant in Catalonia around 1200.

In 1035, he finally followed his father and brother into monastic retirement, becoming a monk in his own foundation of San Martín del Canigó. He died some fifteen years later in 1050. His mortuary roll was taken as far as Liège where the local cathedral chapter contributed fourteen poems.

Marriage and issue
By his marriage to Guisla of Pallars, he had many children:

Raymond (1035–1068), successor in Cerdanya
William I, Count of Cerdanya
Wifred (died 1079), archbishop of Narbonne
Berengar (died 1053), bishop of Elna
Arduin (died 1050)
William Wifred (died 1075), bishop of Urgell
Bernard (died 1050), successor in Berga
Berengar (died 1093), successor of Bernard in Berga and bishop of Girona
Fe (also Fides or Foy), married Hugh of Rouergue

Notes

External links
Image  depicting Saint Ermengol, Bishop of Urgell, swearing an oath of fealty to Wifred II

Counts of Cerdanya
970s births
1035 deaths
Spanish Christian monks
10th-century Visigothic people
10th-century Catalan people
11th-century Visigothic people
11th-century Catalan people